Photomedicine is an interdisciplinary branch of medicine that involves the study and application of light with respect to health and disease. Photomedicine may be related to the practice of various fields of medicine including dermatology, surgery, interventional radiology, optical diagnostics, cardiology, circadian rhythm sleep disorders and oncology.

A branch of photomedicine is light therapy in which bright light strikes the retinae of the eyes, used to treat circadian rhythm disorders and seasonal affective disorder (SAD).  The light can be sunlight or from a light box emitting white or blue (blue/green) light.

Examples

Photomedicine is used as a treatment for many different conditions:
 PUVA for the treatment of psoriasis
 Photodynamic therapy (PDT) for treatment of cancer and macular degeneration -  Nontoxic light-sensitive compounds are targeted to malignant or other diseased cells, then exposed selectively to light, whereupon they become toxic and destroy these cells phototoxicity. One dermatological example of PDT is the targeting malignant cells by bonding the light-sensitive compounds to antibodies to these cells; light exposure at particular wavelengths mediates release of free radicals or other photosensitizing agents, destroying the targeted cells.
 Treating circadian rhythm disorders
 Alopecia, pattern hair loss, etc.
 Free electron laser
 Laser hair removal
 IPL
 Photobiomodulation
 Optical diagnostics, for example optical coherence tomography of coronary plaques using infrared light
 Confocal microscopy and fluorescence microscopy of in vivo tissue
 Diffuse reflectance infrared fourier transform for in vivo quantification of pigments (normal and cancerous), and hemoglobin
 Perpendicular-polarized flash photography and fluorescence photography of the skin

See also
 Blood irradiation therapy
 Aesthetic medicine
 Laser hair removal
 Laser medicine
 Rox Anderson

References

Further reading
 
 
 
 Rünger, Thomas M. Photodermatology, Photoimmunology & Photomedicine Wiley. Online .

External links
 Article: Role of Photomedicine in Gynecological Ontology

Medical physics
Laser medicine
Light therapy